"Don't Give it Up" is a 1981 song by English singer/songwriter Robbie Patton . It is Patton's first and only Top 40 hit on the Billboard Hot 100. "Don't Give it Up" reached #26 in the United States in 1981.

The song is co-produced by Fleetwood Mac producer Ken Caillat, Fleetwood Mac keyboardist Christine McVie, and Patton. Fleetwood Mac members Bob Weston, Christine McVie, Bob Welch, and Lindsey Buckingham are featured as performers. Also, Colin Allen, who co-wrote Fleetwood Mac's "Wish You Were Here" is featured on the track as well.

On November 19, 1981, Bob Welch invited Robbie Patton, Christine McVie, Joey Brasler, David Adelstein, Alvin Taylor, and Robin Sylvester to perform the track during his concert in The Roxy Theatre in California. The live performance was later released on Welch's "Live at The Roxy" album in 2004.

Personnel
Robbie Patton – lead vocals, keyboards
Christine McVie – keyboards, backing vocals
David Adelstein – keyboards, synthesizer, backing vocals
Colin Allen – drums, percussion
Lindsey Buckingham – guitars
Bob Weston – guitars
Tim Weston – guitars
Robin Sylvester – bass, backing vocals
Bob Welch – backing vocals
John Clark – oboe, piccolo, saxophone
Ernie Erhardt – cello
Tony Selvage – violin

Charts
The song spent a total of 13 weeks on the Billboard Hot 100, and peaked at number 26.

References

1981 singles
1981 songs
Songs written by Robbie Patton
Liberty Records singles
Song recordings produced by Ken Caillat